Apensen is a Samtgemeinde ("collective municipality") in the district of Stade, in Lower Saxony, Germany. Its seat is in the village Apensen.

The Samtgemeinde Apensen consists of the following municipalities:
 Apensen
 Beckdorf
 Sauensiek

References